Peter Glynn (born 7 January 1954) is an English former professional rugby league footballer who played in the 1970s and 1980s.

Background
Glynn was born in Widnes, Lancashire, England.

Playing career

International honours
Glynn won caps for England while at St. Helens in 1979 against Wales, and France.

World Club Challenge Final appearances
Glynn was an interchange/substitute in St. Helens 2-25 defeat by the 1975 NSWRFL season premiers, Eastern Suburbs Roosters in the unofficial 1976 World Club Challenge at Sydney Cricket Ground on Tuesday 29 June 1976.

Challenge Cup Final appearances
Glynn played as an interchange/substitute (replacing Billy Benyon) and scored 2-tries in St. Helens' 20-5 victory over Widnes in the 1976 Challenge Cup Final during the 1975–76 season at Wembley Stadium, London on Saturday 8 May 1976.

BBC2 Floodlit Trophy Final appearances
Glynn played , i.e. number 5, in  St. Helens' 11-26 defeat by Hull Kingston Rovers in the 1977 BBC2 Floodlit Trophy Final during the 1977–78 season at Craven Park, Kingston upon Hull on Tuesday 13 December 1977, and played right-, i.e. number 3, and scored 2-tries, and a goals in the 7-13 defeat by Widnes in the 1978 BBC2 Floodlit Trophy Final during the 1978–79 season at Knowsley Road, St. Helens on Tuesday 12 December 1978. The record for the most tries in a BBC2 Floodlit Trophy Final is 2-tries, and is jointly held by; Roy Mathias, Peter Glynn, Gerald Dunn and Stuart Wright.

References

External links
Profile at saints.org.uk

1954 births
Living people
Blackpool Borough players
England national rugby league team players
English rugby league players
Rugby league centres
Rugby league five-eighths
Rugby league fullbacks
Rugby league players from Widnes
Rugby league wingers
Salford Red Devils players
St Helens R.F.C. players